The meridian 32° east of Greenwich is a line of longitude that extends from the North Pole across the Arctic Ocean, Europe, Turkey, Africa, the Indian Ocean, the Southern Ocean, and Antarctica to the South Pole.

The 32nd meridian east forms a great circle with the 148th meridian west.

From Pole to Pole
Starting at the North Pole and heading south to the South Pole, the 32nd meridian east passes through:

{| class="wikitable plainrowheaders"
! scope="col" width="125" | Co-ordinates
! scope="col" | Country, territory or sea
! scope="col" | Notes
|-
| style="background:#b0e0e6;" | 
! scope="row" style="background:#b0e0e6;" | Arctic Ocean
| style="background:#b0e0e6;" |
|-
| 
! scope="row" | 
| Island of Kvitøya, Svalbard
|-
| style="background:#b0e0e6;" | 
! scope="row" style="background:#b0e0e6;" | Barents Sea
| style="background:#b0e0e6;" |
|-
| 
! scope="row" | 
| Murmansk Oblast, Republic of Karelia

Passing through Lake Ladoga

Leningrad Oblast

Novgorod Oblast

Tver Oblast

Smolensk Oblast
|-
| 
! scope="row" | 
|
|-
| 
! scope="row" | 
|Bryansk Oblast
|-
| 
! scope="row" | 
|
|-
| style="background:#b0e0e6;" | 
! scope="row" style="background:#b0e0e6;" | Black Sea
| style="background:#b0e0e6;" |
|-
| 
! scope="row" | 
| For 558 km.
|-
| style="background:#b0e0e6;" | 
! scope="row" style="background:#b0e0e6;" | Mediterranean Sea
| style="background:#b0e0e6;" |
|-
| 
! scope="row" | 
|
|-
| 
! scope="row" | 
|
|-
| 
! scope="row" | 
|
|-
| 
! scope="row" | 
|
|-
| style="background:#b0e0e6;" | 
! scope="row" style="background:#b0e0e6;" | Lake Victoria
| style="background:#b0e0e6;" |
|-
| 
! scope="row" | 
|
|-
| style="background:#b0e0e6;" | 
! scope="row" style="background:#b0e0e6;" | Lake Victoria
| style="background:#b0e0e6;" |
|-
| 
! scope="row" | 
| Passing through Lake Rukwa
|-
| 
! scope="row" | 
|
|-
| 
! scope="row" | 
|
|-
| 
! scope="row" | 
|
|-
| 
! scope="row" | 
|
|-
| 
! scope="row" | 
| Mpumalanga
|-
| 
! scope="row" | 
| For about 11km
|-
| 
! scope="row" | 
| Mpumalanga - for about 16km
|-
| 
! scope="row" | 
|
|-
| 
! scope="row" | 
|
|-
| 
! scope="row" | 
| KwaZulu-Natal
|-
| style="background:#b0e0e6;" | 
! scope="row" style="background:#b0e0e6;" | Indian Ocean
| style="background:#b0e0e6;" |
|-
| style="background:#b0e0e6;" | 
! scope="row" style="background:#b0e0e6;" | Southern Ocean
| style="background:#b0e0e6;" |
|-
| 
! scope="row" | Antarctica
| Queen Maud Land, claimed by 
|-
|}

See also
31st meridian east
33rd meridian east

e032 meridian east